Kris Johnson may refer to:

Kris Johnson (baseball) (born 1984), American baseball player
Kris Johnson (basketball) (born 1975), American basketball player

See also
Chris Johnson (disambiguation)